Fabio Alverà (born 1 June 1959 in Cortina d'Ampezzo) is an Italian curler and curling coach.

He participated in the 2006 Winter Olympics, where the Italian men's team finished in seventh place.

Teams

Men's

Mixed

Record as a coach of national teams

Personal life
His daughter Eleonora is also an Italian curler. She played in the 2006 Winter Olympics as a member of the Italian women's team. His sister Claudio is an Italian champion curler. His son Alberto is also a curler.

References

External links
 

Living people
1959 births
People from Cortina d'Ampezzo
Italian male curlers
Olympic curlers of Italy
Curlers at the 2006 Winter Olympics
Italian curling champions
Italian curling coaches
Sportspeople from the Province of Belluno